Chung-Chuan CHENG (1931-), a female Taiwanese painter, was born in Hsinchu City, Taiwan. She is the granddaughter of philanthropist, Lee His-Cin. 

While majoring in Fine Arts at National Taiwan Normal University, Chung-Chuan Cheng joined the Fifth Moon Art Group, encouraged to set up by a painting professor Ji-Chun Liao in 1957. By the end of the same year, she gave up her studies and decided to reside in Japan with her husband. She did not work on any paintings for more than 30 years until she was nearly 60. 

After that, she started holding solo exhibitions in Japan before returning to Taiwan for joining annual exhibitions of the Fifth Moon Art Group. Just before her 80th birthday, Dr. Sun Yat-Sen Memorial Hall staged her art at an exhibition in 2011. Besides that, a private charity organization also took place to display her works for the benefit of the mental and physical disabled residents in Hsinchu. In 2013, Taipei Fine Arts Museum invited Chung-Chuan Cheng to join the group exhibition “Women Adventurers: Five Eras of Taiwanese Art, 1930-1983”. 

At present, the artist enjoys leading a tranquil life and contentedly creating works.

Painting Works
  Ourartnet.Com
  Radiant  162x112cm Oil on Canvas 2007
  Celebration  91x72.5cm Oil on Canvas  2001
  Tai-Chi VII  50x60.5cm Oil on Canvas  2003
  Innocent  45.5x53cm  Oil on Canvas  2003

Art Characteristics
Chung-Chuan Cheng learned painting from several professors at National Taiwan Normal University, such as Ji-Chun Liao, Shih-Chiao Li, Teh-Chun Chu and Dou-Ci Sun.  The artist used to represent still life portraits, and her art style tended to be realistic. After marrying a dentist, she had devoted her attention to the family for several decades. 

By the end of 1980s, she began to paint again in her sixtieth. Chung-Chuan Cheng in Japan can hardly have chances to go travelling, so those mountains or rivers of her works are not the real scenery.  Moreover, some of her compositions look like veins or nerves proves that medical books exert a strong influence on her. Regarding colors, the artist appreciates noble golden, mysterious black, passionate red colors. Her works conveys elegance, warmth, and vigor. Being a kind and simple artist, Chung-Chuan Cheng considers that she is a fortunate person and aims to express love and positive ideas to everyone through her sincere creations.

See also
Taiwanese art

References

Taiwanese painters
Taiwanese women painters
1931 births
Living people
National Taiwan Normal University alumni